is a Japanese professional football player who plays as a striker for the Japanese WE League club Tokyo Verdy Beleza and the Japan national team.

Early life and education 
Ueki was born in Kanagawa Prefecture on 30 July 1999. She started playing football in 2011, the year Nadeshiko Japan won the 2011 FIFA Women's World Cup in a dramatic victory over the United States. In fact, she started playing a few months before they won the World Cup, but when she shared this with Saki Kumagai (current captain and member of the winning squad in 2011), Kumagai jokingly said to her "you should change it to say that you were inspired to start football after watching our victory, and ultimately made it to the national team yourself. It'll make for a better story!"

From the day she first started football, Ueki has always played as a forward and has never played in any other position throughout her career so far. She has said in multiple interviews that her role model since she was young is fellow Japanese forward Mana Iwabuchi, and she achieved one of her goals during the 2022 AFC Women's Asian Cup when she was selected to pair alongside Iwabuchi for the first time as the two starting strikers in Japan's semi-final against China.

Ueki attended Waseda University, one of the most selective and prestigious universities in Japan, majoring in sports science. While at college she took courses in sports management and marketing as well, declaring that "after I've retired from playing, I want to work to spread women's football and I am studying so that I have as many options as I can to do so." After a gruelling few years juggling classes in the day and practices with the club team in evenings, she successfully graduated in March 2022.

Club career 
She joined Nadeshiko League club Tokyo Verdy Beleza from the youth team in 2015, and was first called up to the senior team in June 2016. She marked her debut with a goal as a substitute in a League Cup match against Speranza Osaka. As of August 2022, she has scored 50 goals in 119 appearances in all competitions for Beleza. In the inaugural 2021–22 WE League season, Ueki was chosen amongst the recipients of the Most Outstanding Players award.

International career 
In 2016, Ueki was selected to the Japan U-17 national team for the 2016 FIFA U-17 Women's World Cup. She played in 6 matches and scored 4 goals, and Japan finished as runners-up in the tournament.

In 2018, Ueki was selected to the Japan U-20 national team for 2018 FIFA U-20 Women's World Cup. She played in all 6 matches and scored 5 goals, including a crucial goal in the their semi-final victory over England and helped Japan win the title.

On 4 April 2019, Ueki debuted for the senior Japan national team against France. Later that year, Ueki was named to Japan's squad for the 2019 FIFA Women's World Cup; however, she was forced to withdraw due to injury on 31 May.

2022 proved to be a true breakout year for Ueki with the national team, as she began to establish herself as a starting striker and finished the 2022 AFC Women's Asian Cup as Japan's top scorer with five goals, and joint second-highest goalscorer of the tournament as a whole.

Personal life 
One of Ueki's main hobbies is reading manga, also known as Japanese comics or graphic novels, and she revealed that she has a collection of over 1000 copies of such books at home. She was even invited to make a cameo appearance in a television drama adaptation of the manga series Shiyakusho that aired on TV Tokyo from October to December 2019.

Career statistics

Club

International 

Scores and results list Japan's goal tally first, score column indicates score after each Ueki goal.

Honours 
Tokyo Verdy Beleza

 Nadeshiko League: 2016, 2017, 2018, 2019
 Nadeshiko League Cup: 2017, 2018, 2019, 2020
 WE League Cup runner-up: 2022-23
 Empress's Cup: 2014, 2017, 2018, 2019, 2020, 2022
 AFC Women's Club Championship: 2019
Japan U19
 AFC U-19 Women's Championship: 2015

Japan

 EAFF Women's Football Championship: 2019, 2022

Individual

 WE League Outstanding Players Award: 2021-22

References

External links

Japan Football Association

1999 births
Living people
Association football people from Kanagawa Prefecture
Japanese women's footballers
Japan women's international footballers
Nadeshiko League players
Nippon TV Tokyo Verdy Beleza players
Women's association football forwards